The 2011 Bank of Communication Shanghai Masters was a professional ranking snooker tournament that took place between 5–11 September 2011 at the Shanghai Grand Stage in Shanghai, China. This was the first time that the Bank of Communications sponsored the event.

Ali Carter was the defending champion, but lost in the first round 4–5 against Mark King.

Mark Selby won his second ranking title by defeating Mark Williams 10–9 in the final. By doing so, he became world number one for the first time in his career.

Prize fund
The breakdown of prize money for this year is shown below: 

Winner: £65,000
Runner-up: £32,000
Semi-final: £15,000
Quarter-final: £10,000
Last 16: £7,000
Last 32: £4,000
Last 48: £2,300
Last 64: £1,500

Stage one highest break: £200
Stage two highest break: £2,000
Total: £350,000

Wildcard round
These matches were played in Shanghai on 5 September 2011.

Main draw

Final

Qualifying
These matches took place between 31 July and 4 August 2011 at the World Snooker Academy, Sheffield, England.

Preliminary round
Best of 9 frames

Round 1–4

Century breaks

Qualifying stage centuries

 145, 100  Michael White
 138, 107  James Wattana
 136, 104  Fergal O'Brien
 136  Tom Ford
 129  Jamie Burnett
 129  Anthony Hamilton
 127  Robin Hull
 123, 123, 100  Kurt Maflin
 123  Ben Woollaston
 120  Nigel Bond
 119, 110  Passakorn Suwannawat
 118  Adam Duffy

 117, 100  Barry Pinches
 115  Mark Davis
 114, 100  Liu Chuang
 114  Aditya Mehta
 111, 107, 103  Stuart Bingham
 111  Anthony McGill
 110  Cao Yupeng
 107  Alfie Burden
 104, 104  Jack Lisowski
 104, 100  Adam Wicheard
 102  Dominic Dale
 101  Joe Jogia

Televised stage centuries
 
 143, 102  Shaun Murphy
 132, 130, 129, 100  Mark Williams
 129, 123, 112, 107, 104  Anthony Hamilton
 129, 112  Stuart Bingham
 128, 102  Dominic Dale
 117, 113, 110  Mark Selby
 112  John Higgins
 111, 110  Ronnie O'Sullivan
 109  Robert Milkins
 101  Jamie Cope
 100  Michael Holt
 100  Mark Allen

References

2011
Shanghai Masters
Shanghai Masters